Niala is a small town and commune in the Cercle of Bla in the Ségou Region of Mali. In 1998 the commune had a population of 7667.

References

Communes of Ségou Region